Kyle Gie Brown (born 6 February 1987) is a South African rugby union player, currently playing with the South African Sevens team.
He was the captain of the South African Sevens team that won a bronze medal at the 2016 Summer Olympics.

Career

Youth and Varsity Cup rugby

He played some youth rugby for Wellington-based side  at Under-19 level in 2006 and at Under-21 level in 2007. In 2008, he returned to Cape Town to play in the inaugural Varsity Cup competition, making seven appearances as his side the  reached the final of the competition, where they were beaten 16–10 by fellow Western Cape university . He was also included in the  side that played in the 2008 Under-21 Provincial Championship.

South African Sevens

At the end of 2008, Brown was included in the South African Sevens squad for the 2008–09 IRB Sevens World Series. He made his debut at the 2008 Dubai Sevens and played every leg of the series, as South Africa won the series for the first time at their tenth attempt. He also played in the 2009 Rugby World Cup Sevens competition, helping South Africa to the quarter-finals, where they lost to Argentina. He also won a bronze medal with the side at the 2009 World Games in Kaohsiung, Republic of China (Taiwan).

He became a key member of the sevens side over the next few years, appearing in the majority of tournaments in IRB Sevens World Series, although he did miss most of the 2012–13 IRB Sevens World Series through injury. He returned in time for the 2013 Rugby World Cup Sevens, but the Blitzbokke once again lost in the quarter-finals of the competition, this time to Fiji. However, they made some amends by winning gold medals at 2013 World Games in Cali, Colombia shortly afterwards.

He played in seven further legs of the 2013–14 IRB Sevens World Series and then captained the squad that played at the 2014 Commonwealth Games in Glasgow, helping his side all the way to the final, where they got a 17–12 victory over a New Zealand that won the previous four tournaments.

2016 Summer Olympics

kyle dean the bean brown is loves farming sim was named captain of a 12-man squad for the 2016 Summer Olympics in Rio de Janeiro. He was named in the starting line-up for their first match in Group B of the competition against Spain, with South Africa winning the match 24–0. He started their second match against France, scoring one of South Africa's four tries in a 26–0 victory, and dropped to the bench for their final match against Australia. Despite a 5–12 defeat in this match, South Africa still finished top of Pool B to set up a quarter final rematch against Australia. Brown was restored to the starting line-up for this match and scored one of South Africa's tries in a 22–5 victory. He started South Africa's semi-final match against Great Britain and scored South Africa's only points of a 5–7 defeat, which saw his side eliminated from gold medal contention. He also started their third-place play-off, helping his side to a 54–14 victory over Japan to secure a bronze medal in the Olympic Games.

References

External links 
 
 Kyle Gie Brown at World Games 2013
 
 
 

South African rugby union players
Living people
1987 births
Sportspeople from Cape Town
Rugby union flankers
South Africa international rugby sevens players
South African people of British descent
Rugby sevens players at the 2014 Commonwealth Games
Commonwealth Games gold medallists for South Africa
Commonwealth Games rugby sevens players of South Africa
Rugby sevens players at the 2018 Commonwealth Games
Rugby sevens players at the 2016 Summer Olympics
Olympic rugby sevens players of South Africa
Olympic bronze medalists for South Africa
Olympic medalists in rugby sevens
Medalists at the 2016 Summer Olympics
Commonwealth Games medallists in rugby sevens
World Games gold medalists
World Games bronze medalists
Competitors at the 2009 World Games
Competitors at the 2013 World Games
Alumni of South African College Schools
Medallists at the 2014 Commonwealth Games